Burmantofts Pottery was the common trading name of a manufacturer of ceramic pipes and construction materials, named after the Burmantofts district of Leeds, England.

Company history

The business began in 1859 when fire clay was discovered in a coal mine owned by William Wilcock and John Lassey. In 1863 Lassey's share was bought by John Holroyd and the company then named Wilcock & Co.

In 1879, after a period of expansion, the firm made decorative bricks and tiles in orange or buff-coloured architectural terracotta, glazed bricks, and glazed terracotta. Architect Alfred Waterhouse used their materials in his Yorkshire College (1883) in Leeds, and his National Liberal Club (1884) in London.  From 1880 they also made art pottery such as vases and decorative domestic items.

In 1888 the company was renamed The Burmantofts Company but in 1889 it merged with other Yorkshire companies to found The Leeds Fireclay Co. Ltd., the largest in the country.

Burmantofts art pottery

This was produced between 1880 and 1904 at the instigation of James Holroyd, the works manager, as an addition to industrial glazed ceramic products. Companies such as Mintons, Royal Doulton and William De Morgan had established a market for middle-class home decorative objects.  The company was fortunate in having both coal and four sorts of high-purity clay on the same site.  The plasticity gave good reproduction of shape and the low iron content meant there was not discoloration by oxidation when fired at high temperature, giving glazes of high clarity and brilliance.

Early examples were individual works of art, notably in barbotine style where a plain base had a design worked in relief with slip and painted, but the company soon developed production lines for decoration of individual shapes, either in a single glaze or painted with flowers and so on (signed by the decorator), for sale at a lower price to a larger market, but still of high quality.  Over 2000 different shapes are recorded, including pots, vases, bottles and table items.  The base usually had 'Burmantofts Faience' or later 'BF' on the base, along with the shape number.  Influences included Art Nouveau, Persian, Chinese and Japanese.  French artist Pierre Mallet (who also designed for Minton's) contributed a number of designs. Decorative tiles were also produced.

In 1885 products were on sale in London (at Harrods and Liberty's), Paris and Montreal.<ref name=pev>Pevsner Architectural Guides – Leeds, Susan Wrathwell, 2005, </ref> However, by 1904 the products were no longer profitable because of a large number of competing products from Britain and nearby Europe of lower price, and production ceased.

Burmantofts architectural faience

James Holroyd realised that a more decorative version of the company's salt-glazed bricks could be useful as an architectural facing material which could be washed from the grime of industrial cities and be more permanent than paint.  This combination of artistic and business sense led to considerable success and material which is still in good condition more than a century later.  He created a team of experts for the practical side and employed sculptor Edward Caldwell Spruce and architect Maurice Bingham Adams in designs.  Simple coloured tiles or bricks were complemented by relief patterns, and a variety of glazes.  However, the fashion for highly modelled surfaces passed and from 1904 the company concentrated on plain tiles used as facing, notably an artificial marble called Marmo, as used on Atlas House, King Street, Leeds and Michelin House, London, and Lefco'' which had a granite appearance and was also used for garden ornaments.  These were in production until the company closed in 1957.

Examples 
Atlas House, King Street, Leeds 
County Arcade, Leeds (Frank Matcham)
Great Hall interior, University of Leeds, 1890–94, (Alfred Waterhouse)
Michelin House, South Kensington, London
National Liberal Club, London
London Road Fire Station, Manchester
Midland Hotel, Manchester (Charles Trubshaw)
 Peveril of Peak, Manchester

References

External links

Burmantofts Pottery Shards
BBC Leeds Local History Glazing over
Tessellations 
Understanding Terracotta

British companies established in 1859
Building materials
Terracotta
English pottery
1859 establishments in England
Ceramics manufacturers of England
Leeds Blue Plaques
Art pottery
Defunct companies based in Leeds
Manufacturing companies established in 1859